Polythionic acid is an oxoacid which has a straight chain of sulfur atoms and has the chemical formula Sn(SO3H)2 (n > 2). Trithionic acid (H2S3O6), tetrathionic acid (H2S4O6) are simple examples. They are the conjugate acids of polythionates.  The compounds of n < 80 are expected to exist, and those of n < 20 have already been synthesized. Dithionic acid (H2S2O6) does not belong to the polythionic acids due to strongly different properties.

Nomenclature 
All polythionates anion contains chains of sulfur atoms attached to the terminal SO3H-groups. Names of polythionic acids are determined by the number of atoms in the chain of sulfur atoms:

  – dithionic acid
  – trithionic acid
  – 
  – , etc.

History 
Numerous acids and salts of this group have a venerable history, and chemistry systems, where they exist, dates back to the studies John Dalton devoted to the behavior of hydrogen sulfide in aqueous solutions of sulfur dioxide (1808). This solution now has the name of Heinrich Wilhelm Ferdinand Wackenroder, who conducted a systematic study (1846).

Preparation and properties 
Reactions from both ends of the polysulfane chain lead to the formation of polysulfonodisulfonic acid HO3SSnSO3H.

Many methods exist for the synthesis of these acids, but the mechanism is unclear because of the large number of simultaneously occurring and competing reactions such as redox, chain transfer, and disproportionation. Typical examples are:

 Interaction between hydrogen sulfide and sulfur dioxide in highly dilute aqueous solution. This yields a complex mixture of various oxyacids of sulfur of different structures, called Wackenroder solution. At temperatures above 20 °C solutes slowly decomposes with separation unit sulfur, sulfur dioxide, and sulfuric acid.
H2S + H2SO3 → H2S2O2 + H2O
H2S2O2 + 2 H2SO3 → H2S4O6 + 2 H2O
H2S4O6 + H2SO3 → H2S3O6 + H2S2O3
 SCl2 + 2  → [O3SSSO 3]2− + 2 HCl
 S2Cl2 + 2  → [O3SS2SO3]2− + 2 HCl
 SCl2 + 2  → [O3SS3SO3]2− + 2 HCl

Anhydrous polythionic acids can be formed in diethyl ether solution by the following three general ways:
 HSnSO3H + SO3 → H2Sn+2O6 (n = 1, 2 ... 8)
 H2Sn + 2 SO3 → H2Sn+2O6 (n = 1, 2 ... 8)
 2 HSnSO3H + I2 → H2S2n+2O6 + 2 HI (n = 1, 2 ... 6)

Polythionic acids with a small number of sulfur atoms in the chain (n = 3, 4, 5, 6) are the most stable. Polythionic acids are stable only in aqueous solutions, and are rapidly destroyed at higher concentrations with the release of sulfur, sulfur dioxide and - sometimes - sulfuric acid. Acid salts of polythionic acids do not exist. Polythionate ions are significantly more stable than the corresponding acids.

Under the action of oxidants (potassium permanganate, potassium dichromate) polythionic acids and their salts are oxidized to sulfate, and the interaction with strong reducing agents (amalgam of sodium) converts them into sulfites and dithionites.

Occurrence
Polythionic acids are rarely encountered, but polythionates are common and important. 

Polythionic acids have been identified in crater lakes. The phenomenon may be useful to predict volcanic activity.

References

Sulfur oxoacids
Acids
Sulfur compounds